María Begoña Vila Costas (born 1963) is a Spanish astrophysicist specializing in the study of spiral galaxies. She currently resides in Washington, D.C. and works as a systems engineer at NASA's Goddard Space Flight Center. She is the lead engineer for the Fine Guidance Sensor and Near Infrared Imager and Slitless Spectrograph (FGS-NIRISS) on the James Webb Space Telescope – the Hubble's successor – in addition to being in charge of the final cold test of the group of instruments before their integration with the telescope.

Career
She received her doctorate in Astrophysics at the Jodrell Bank Centre for Astrophysics at the University of Manchester in 1989.

Beginning in 2006 she worked on the design and construction of the Fine Guidance Sensor and Near Infrared Imager and Slitless Spectrograph (FGS-NIRISS) that will be carried by the James Webb Space Telescope at a Canadian company under the direction of the Canadian Space Agency. When it was delivered in 2012 and the first cold test was done, NASA decided to hire her through an external company as a systems engineer for the instrument.

Since 2013 she has been "FGS lead systems engineer", in charge of tests of the sensor, its operations in orbit, limitations, software components, etc. She also coordinates all the scientific instruments grouped in the Integrated Science Instrument Module (ISIM) for the cold tests.

She is a member of Españoles Científicos en USA (ECUSA-DC), an organization that encompasses the Spanish scientific community in Maryland, Virginia, and Washington, D.C.

In 2016, she was honored by NASA with the Exceptional Public Achievement Medal for her "years of outstanding leadership and achievement", as well as the design and development of the FGS-NIRISS.

References

External links
 Begoña Vila at NASA

1963 births
21st-century Spanish scientists
Alumni of the University of Manchester
Living people
People from Vigo
Spanish astrophysicists
Spanish women engineers
Spanish women physicists
University of Santiago de Compostela alumni
Women astrophysicists
Women systems engineers
21st-century women engineers